Hiya is a Seattle-based company that sells callers profile information to identify incoming calls and block suggested unwanted ones.

History
Hiya was originally developed as a Caller-ID app for Whitepages, the largest database of contact information for Americans. In April 2016, Hiya was spun off from Whitepages, by that time, the Hiya app had 25 million downloads. Whitepages' founder Alex Algard Sr stepped down from the parent company to focus on leading Hiya, which as of December 2020 employs 120.

In February 2016, Hiya (then part of Whitepages) reached a deal with Samsung to integrate its caller profile and spam protection services into all Galaxy S7 and Galaxy S7 edge phones in 16 countries. The company extended its partnership with Samsung in a separate deal in August, 2016 to include its service on the Galaxy Note 7, and to expand the partnership to a total of 28 countries. In August 2016, Hiya launched Hiya Cloud, its network level caller ID and call-blocking offering.

After offering only a limited version of its app for iPhones, Hiya announced in September 2016 that the full version of its app would be available on iOS 10. Soon after Hiya began providing spam protection services to AT&T phones through the AT&T Call Protect product. In 2017, Hiya entered a similar partnership with ZTE to provide call spam protection services for all Axon 7 users.

In October 2017, Hiya announced it had received its first outside funding: a Series A of $18 million led by Balderton Capital with participation from Nautilus Venture Partners and Lumia Capital. Hiya said it would use the funds to expand globally. Following the investment, Balderton’s Lars Fjeldsoe-Nielsen, an early executive at Uber and Dropbox, joined Hiya’s board.

Features
Users can report numbers associated with unwanted calls through the app as well as block future calls from certain phone numbers.

References

External links
Official website

Companies based in Seattle
Telecommunications companies of the United States
Caller ID